Didier Munduteguy is a French sailor born on May 19, 1953 in Bayonne, Basque Country. He twice competed in the Vendée Globe retiring from the 1996-1997 and finishing in 14th in 2000-2001 edition.

After his ocean racing days he started a career in seaport administration, first in Saint Jean de Luz and more recently with the Bayonne Port Authority.

References

1953 births
Living people
People from Bayonne
French male sailors (sport)
Sportspeople from Bayonne
IMOCA 60 class sailors
French Vendee Globe sailors
1996 Vendee Globe sailors
2000 Vendee Globe sailors
Vendée Globe finishers
Single-handed circumnavigating sailors